The Indiana Dunes are natural sand dunes occurring at the southern end of Lake Michigan in the American State of Indiana. They are known for their ecological significance. Many conservationists have played a role in preserving parts of the Indiana Dunes. The Hour Glass, a museum in Ogden Dunes, showcases some of the ecological import of the Dunes.

Human presences in the Indiana Dunes have existed since the retreat of the glaciers some 14,000 years ago. The southern lakes area was a rich hunting ground and there is little evidence of permanent communities forming during the earlier years. Archeological evidence is consistent with seasonal hunting camps. The earliest evidence for permanent camps is consistent with the Hopewellian occupation of the Ohio valley. Five groups of mounds have been documented in the dunes area. These mounds would be consistent with the period of 200 BCE (Goodall focus) to 800 CE (early Mississippian). The advent of European exploration and trade introduced more changes to the human environment. Tribal animosities and traditional European competition affected tribal relations. Entire populations began moving westward, while others sought to dominate large geographic trading areas. Once again the dunes became a middle point on a journey from the east or the west. It continued to remain a key hunting ground for villages over a wide area. It wasn't until the 19th century that native villages once again were scattered through the area, but this was soon followed by European settlement. Today, the entire coast line has been settled and filled with homes, factories, businesses and public parks.

Pre-Columbian
Early man entered the area south of Lake Michigan after the glaciers retreated around 15,000 years ago. As the glaciers receded, people began to move into the area. The earliest people recorded in Indiana are the Early Paleoindians. No sites have been found in the dunes. During the period of this cultural group, the dunes area had just emerged from beneath the continental glaciers. The landscape was not conducive to the existence of the animals upon which the Early Paleoindian culture depended. A few scattered Late Paleoindian artifacts have been found on the higher and older ridges in the dunes.

Multiple locations within the dunes have yielded artifacts from the archaic traditions. Included are Early Archaic Lecroy or Kanawha bifurcate-stemmed point (7800 and 5800 BC), Greenville Creek side notched. Also documented are four sites with projectile points that are the Middle to Late Archaic points found in the Great Lakes area.

The dunes developed from the 'glacial lakes' that formed between the Valparaiso Moraine and the receding glacier. As such, there are no glacial kames in the dunes area. With the lack of glacial kames to locate burials, it is only the projectile points that are usable for rough dating. Simultaneous with the Glacial Kame people, the Red Ocher people and the Old Copper Culture. Like the Glacial Kame culture, these other groups are identified by their burial goods. The centers of the Red Ocher and Old Copper Culture are further from the Indiana Dunes and no artifacts have been identified as being from any of these three cultural groups.

The earliest signs of long-term or permanent habitation are the mounds that exist across northwest Indiana. While undated, many are placed in the cultural group that has become known as the Goodall focus The Goodall focus is a cultural grouping of the Hopewell culture. The dunes are the far western and most southern expression of Goodall sites. The group is centered in western Michigan along the Grand, Kalamazoo and Galien Rivers.

The mounds located in the dunes are represented by six sites.

By the 15th century CE, the communities of Native American surrounding the southern shores of Lake Michigan were of the Huber-Berrien group. These were a mound builder associated people, contemporary to the Fort Ancient communities of the Ohio River valley

Historic Native American communities

Iroquois Wars or Beaver Wars 
The legends of the Potawatomi and Miami peoples place them in the Indiana Dunes prior to the Iroquois War or Beaver Wars (1641–1701). It was during the war period that both nations migrated north to the Door Peninsula with many other tribes for protection. The Iroquois War centered in the lower peninsula of modern Ontario, Canada, north of Lakes Erie and Ontario. The early stages of the Iroquois Wars were among the Erie Indians on the southern shore of Lake Erie. By 1656 the tribe had been destroyed or dispersed. Most of the Iroquois War is taken from the French records in Canada, leaving little details on activities further west and south of the lakes. By 1677, the Miami and Potawatomi had begun to return to the southern shore of Lake Michigan. The Miami were at the western bend of the Calumet River (Blue Island, Illinois). On the far eastern edge of the dunes, the Miami and Mascouten had returned to the St. Joseph River of Lake Michigan sometime after 1673. Another village grew at the portage from the South Bend of the St. Joseph after 1679. Additional villages may have been located through the dunes by this time, but there are no mention of any villages in the journals of René-Robert Cavelier, Sieur de La Salle.

The Iroquois raided the Illinois Confederation village at Fort St. Louis, or Starved Rock, in 1684. Then in 1687, the Iroquois raided the villages in Blue Island area. No further incursion passed around the south end of Lake Michigan. By the late 1680s, the allied Algonquian peoples had taken the war east to the Iroquois homeland, bringing an end to the Iroquois threat. By 1701, the eastern villages along the St. Joseph and expanded to include not only Miami and Mascouten, but Shawnee, Mahican, and Potawatomi. The only other identified community was over a hundred miles (106 km) south at Ouiatenon on the Wabash River.

French era 
During the French Era of presences in the Indiana Dunes (1720–1761), primary villages were located at the mouth of the Chicago River and the northern reach of the St. Joseph River (from modern South Bend, Indiana, to Niles, Michigan). The French authorities in Montreal encouraged licensed traders to winter in native villages. This had the effect of concentrating communities at key travel points. The Indiana Dunes were, at best, an area of passage. The nearest key points were the Chicago Portage to the west and the St. Joseph Portage to the east. The Mesquakie, Sauk, established villages at Chicago in the 1740s. The Potawatomi are reported around the French trading post at Chicago beginning in the 1750s. On the east, the Potawatomi and Miami developed villages on the St. Joseph River downstream from the Kankakee and St. Joseph portage after 1720. During this time, the dunes would have been seasonal hunting grounds.

Exploration 
Like the American Indian 'occupation' of the Indiana Dunes, exploration by Europeans swirled around the southern shore of Lake Michigan, rather than through the heart of the dunes. The French quickly 'discovered' or were told of the water routes that passed from the south side of Lake Michigan to places further south. The two primary routes were by the Chicago Portage in Illinois or by the portage between the St. Joseph River and the Kankakee River in northern Indiana.

Louis Joliet and Father Jacques Marquette 1673 sent by Jean Talon intendant of New France. Promised to return and establish a mission among the Illinois. This journey was along the western shore of Lake Michigan to the Chicago Portage. In October 1674, Father Jacques Marquette, with Pierre Porteret and Jacques Largilliers, left the mission of St. Francis Xavier in Green Bay. Because of illness, the party spent the winter at the Chicago Portage. By Easter in April 1675, the party was on the Illinois River, south of modern Ottawa, Illinois. Here, he is said to have preached to 1500 Indians. When Marquette, once again became ill, he requested to return to Michilimackinac in the Straits of Mackinac. This time, instead of following the western border of Lake Michigan, they choose to follow the shorter route across the southern shore and up the eastern shore. 
Petit Fort

Early trails 
Known by many names and by many routes, the trails through the dunes sought out the easiest routes. The first evidence of trails comes from Joseph Bailly in 1822, when he settled south of the Calumet Beach Trail. This route has also been referred to as the Lake Shore Trail. It had first come to the notice of the American government after the War of 1812. The U.S. government sought to establish a trail military road from Fort Ponchartrain du Detroit to Fort Dearborn, now in Chicago. It was not until 1827 that the route was identified and in use. It followed the Great Sauk Trail from Detroit to modern LaPorte, Indiana. Here the traveler had two options. The primary road continued to follow the Sauk Trail across Indiana through Porter and Lake Counties to Illinois. The other option was to go northwest to Trail Creek and follow the lake shore the last  to Fort Dearborn. The military road became known as the Chicago Road. By 1833, regular stagecoach service was provided between Detroit and Chicago.

See also
 Michigan Road – Madison (Ohio River), Indianapolis, South Bend, Michigan City
 U.S. Route 12 in Indiana

Fur trade and settlement

Nineteenth century

Octave Chanute organized the International Conference on Aerial Navigation in 1893, during the World's Columbian Exposition in Chicago. From there, in conjunction with his contacts in Europe, he joined with younger experimenters, including Augustus Herring and William Avery. In 1896 and 1897 they tested hang gliders based on designs by German aviator Otto Lilienthal. They also tested their own hang glider design. To make use of the steady winds, they came to the town of Miller Beach on the shores of Lake Michigan. The location is today in Marquette Park. These experiments convinced Chanute and his partners that the way to achieve the extra lift needed without a lot of weight was to place stack several wings one above the other. The idea was originally proposed by British engineer Francis Wenham in 1866 and tested by Lilienthal in the 1890s. Chanute invented the "strut-wire" braced wing structure to hold the several wings together, which became the standard design in powered biplanes. The Strut wire design came from Chanutes bridge designs using the Pratt truss. The Wright brothers, based their Flyer designs on the Chanute "double-decker".

During this period, the dunes became the site of hang gliding experiments carried out in 1896–1897 by aeronaut Octave Chanute. Although the Carrs had lived on the land for years, United States Steel Corporation claimed ownership in 1919. After years of negotiations, U.S.Steel and the estate of the Carrs agreed to the donation of the land to the City of Gary for a park. Originally dedicated as "Lake Front Park", it was renamed in honor of Father Pere Marquette.

Twentieth century

In June 1954, the Army Corps of Engineers purchased a vacant site, east of Ogden Dunes. By the end of the year, a contract was awarded to construct a $1,000,000 Nike-Ajax guided missile base. Two tracts of land, totaling , were developed for a component of the 9th AAA Guided Missile Battalion. As the most easterly facility in the 15-unit Chicago-Milwaukee Defense system, it was designed for the protection of the Gary industrial district from attack from enemy bombers. The facility included three underground storage structures for missiles located on the eastern site. A half-mile (0.3 km) west, the administrative headquarters facility was constructed with nine buildings, including mess halls, barracks, and administration offices, recreation, generators, storage, and smaller buildings. The facility was shut down in April 1974 and transferred to the National Park Service. It was rehabilitated in 1977 as the administrative offices of the Indiana Dunes National Lakeshore.

Movies filmed at the Dunes include Julius Caesar (1950) and Lost in the Soudan (1910).

Twenty-first century

Park creation

Early preservation 
The legislation that authorized Indiana Dunes National Lakeshore in 1966 resulted from a movement that began in 1899. Three key individuals helped make Indiana Dunes National Lakeshore a reality: Henry Cowles, a botanist from the University of Chicago; Paul H. Douglas, U.S. senator for the State of Illinois; and Dorothy R. Buell, an Ogden Dunes resident and English teacher. Henry Cowles published an article entitled "Ecological Relations of the Vegetation on Sand Dunes of Lake Michigan" in the Botanical Gazette in 1899 that established Cowles as the "father of plant ecology" in North America and brought international attention to the intricate ecosystems existing on the dunes.

But Cowles' article and the new international awareness were not enough to curtail the struggle between industry and preservation that governed the development of Indiana Dunes National Lakeshore. In 1916, the region was booming with industry in the form of steel mills and power plants. Hoosier Slide, for example,  in height, was the largest sand dune on Indiana's lakeshore. During the first twenty years of the battle to Save the Dunes, the Ball brothers of Muncie, Indiana, manufacturers of glass fruit jars, and the Pittsburgh Plate Glass Company of Kokomo carried Hoosier Slide away in railroad boxcars.

It was this kind of activity by local industry that spurred Cowles, along with Thomas W. Allinson and Jens Jensen, to form the Prairie Club of Chicago in 1908. The Prairie Club was the first group to propose that a portion of the Indiana Dunes be protected from commercial interests and maintained in its pristine condition for the enjoyment of the people. Out of the Prairie Club of Chicago came the precursor to the current park: The National Dunes Park Association (NDPA). The NDPA promoted the theme: "A National Park for the Middle West, and all the Middle West for a National Park."

Creation of Marquette Park 

On October 30, 1916, only one month after the National Park Service itself was established (August 25, 1916), Stephen Mather, the Service's first Director, (shown at the far left in the adjacent photo leading a tour of park advocates in the dunes in 1916) held hearings in Chicago to gauge public sentiment on a "Sand Dunes National Park". Four hundred people attended and 42 people, including Henry Cowles, spoke in favor of the park proposal; there were no opponents.

The battle for a national park was crippled, however, when the United States entered the First World War. National priorities changed and revenues were targeted for national defense, not the development of a national park. The popular slogan "Save the Dunes!" became "First Save the Country, Then Save the Dunes!" As the nation went from a world war into a depression, hopes to save the dunes began to fade.

Creation of the state park 

In 1926, after a ten-year petition by the State of Indiana to preserve the dunes, the Indiana Dunes State Park opened to the public. The State Park was still relatively small in size and scope and the push for a national park continued. In 1949, Dorothy Buell became involved with the Indiana Dunes Preservation Council (IDPC). The efforts of Buell resulted in a Save the Dunes Council in 1952.

However, the struggle did not end there. A union of politicians and businessmen desired to maximize economic development by obtaining federal funds to construct a Port of Indiana. Hoosier politicians and businessmen were eager to exploit the economic prosperity promised by linking the Great Lakes to the Atlantic Ocean shipping lanes via the St. Lawrence Seaway. In light of this, Save the Dunes Council President Dorothy Buell and council members began a nationwide membership and fundraising drive to buy the land they desperately sought to preserve.

Creation of the national lakeshore 

In the summer of 1961, those fighting to save the dunes began to see greater possibilities for hope. Then President John F. Kennedy supported congressional authorization for Cape Cod National Seashore in Massachusetts, which marked the first time federal monies would be used to purchase natural parkland. President Kennedy also took a stand on the National Lakeshore, outlining a program to link the nation's economic vitality to a movement for conservation of the natural environment. This program became known as the Kennedy Compromise, 1963–1964.

The Kennedy Compromise entailed the creation of a national lakeshore and a port to satisfy industrial needs. Then Illinois Senator Paul H. Douglas spoke tirelessly to the public and Congress in a drive to save the dunes, earning him the title of "the third senator from Indiana." In 1966, Douglas made sure that the highly desired Burns Waterway Harbor (Port of Indiana) could only come with the authorization of the Indiana Dunes National Lakeshore.

By the time the 89th Congress adjourned in late 1966, the bill had passed and the Indiana Dunes National Lakeshore finally became a reality. While the 1966 authorizing legislation included only  of land and water, the Save the Dunes Council, National Park Service, and others continued to seek expansion of the boundaries of preservation.

See also 

Chanute Aquatorium

References

Sources 
 Biggar, H. P.; The Early Trading Companies of New France; Toronto, Ontario; Warwick Bros. & Rutter; 1901; Reprinted Scholarly Press, Inc. 1977
 Carver, Jonathan; Travels Through the Interior Parts of North America; London, England; 1781; Reprinted Minneapolis, Minnesota; Ross & Haines, Inc.; 1956
 Eckert, Alan W., Gateway to Empire, Little, Brown & Company, Boston, Massachusetts, 1983
 Faulkner, Charles H., The Late Prehistoric Occupation of Northwestern Indiana; A Study of the Upper Mississippi Cultures of the Kankakee Valley, Indiana Historical Society, Indianapolis, 1972.
 Greenbie, Sydney; Frontiers and the Fur Trade; New York, New York; The John Day Company; 1929
 Hatcher, Harlan and Erich A Walter; A Pictorial History of the Great Lakes; New York, New York; Bonanza Books; 1963
Havighurst, Walter (ed); The Great Lakes Reader; New York, New York; The MacMillan Co.; 1966
History of the Great Lakes; Chicago, Illinois; J.H. Beers & Co.; 1879; reprinted Cleveland, Ohio; Freshwater Press Inc.; 1972
Holand, Hjalmar R.; Explorations in America Before Columbus; New York, New York; Twayne Publishers, Inc.; 1956
Hough, Jack L.; Geology of the Great Lakes; Urbana, Illinois; University of Illinois Press; 1958
Hyde, George E.; Indians of the Woodlands From Prehistoric Times to 1725; Norman, Oklahoma; University of Oklahoma Press; 1962
Innes, Harold A.; The Fur Trade in Canada; Toronto, Ontario; University of Toronto Press; 1930, revised 1970
 Kinietz, W. Vernon; The Indians of the Western Great Lakes: 1615 1760; Ann Arbor, Michigan; University of Michigan Press; 1940
Kubiak, William J.; Great Lakes Indians, A Pictorial Guide; New York, New York; Bonanza Books; 1970
 Lavender, David; The Fist in the Wilderness; Albuquerque, New Mexico; University of New Mexico Press; 1964
King, B.A. and Jonathan Ela; The Faces of the Great Lakes; San Francisco, California; Sierra Club Books; 1977
Mallery, Arlington and Mary Roberts Harrison; Rediscovery of Lost America; New York, New York; E.P. Dutton; 1979
 Quaife, Milo M., (ed); The John Askin Papers; Detroit, Michigan; Detroit Library Commission; 1928
 Quimby, George I.; Indian Life in the Upper Great Lakes 11,000 BC to AD 1800; Chicago, Illinois; University of Chicago; 1960
 Van Every, Dale; A Company of Heroes: The American Frontier 1775–1783; New York, New York; Mentor Book; 1963
 Van Every, Dale; Ark of Empire: The American Frontier 1784–1803; New York, New York; William Morrow and Company; 1963

Indiana Dunes National Park
Hopewellian peoples
History of Indiana by place